Sanggau is a Dayak language of Borneo. Sanggau varieties are quite divergent, and may be distinct languages.

References

Languages of Indonesia
Land Dayak languages